The 2017 Big South Conference baseball tournament will be held from May 23 to 28.  The top eight regular season finishers of the conference's ten teams will meet in the double-elimination tournament to be held at Lexington County Baseball Stadium in Lexington, South Carolina. The tournament champion will earn the conference's automatic bid to the 2017 NCAA Division I baseball tournament.

Seeding and format
The top eight finishers of the league's ten teams qualify for the double-elimination tournament. Teams are seeded based on conference winning percentage, with the first tiebreaker being head-to-head record.

Results

References

Tournament
Big South Conference Baseball Tournament
Big South Conference baseball tournament
Big South Conference baseball tournament